General elections were held in Guinea-Bissau on 3 July 1994, with a second round for the presidential election on 7 August. They were the first multi-party elections since independence, and also the first time the president had been directly elected, as previously the post had been elected by the National People's Assembly. In the presidential election, the result was a victory for incumbent João Bernardo Vieira of the African Party for the Independence of Guinea and Cape Verde (PAIGC), who defeated Kumba Ialá of Social Renewal Party in the second round. In the Assembly election, 1,136 candidates ran for the 100 seats, of which the PAIGC won 62.

Voter turnout in the presidential election was 89.3% on 3 July and 81.6% on 7 August. In the parliamentary election it was 88.9%.

Results

President
Independent candidate Carlos Gomes was supported by the Democratic Convergence Party, as its leader Victor Mandinga was not eligible to run for president, as he failed to meet the qualification that both parents be Guineans born in the country.

National People's Assembly

References

Guinea-Bissau
1994 in Guinea-Bissau
Elections in Guinea-Bissau
Presidential elections in Guinea-Bissau
July 1994 events in Africa
August 1994 events in Africa